Pope Cosmas II of Alexandria was the Coptic Pope of Alexandria and Patriarch of the See of St. Mark (851–858).

9th-century Coptic Orthodox popes of Alexandria